Warren Frost (June 5, 1925 – February 17, 2017) was an American actor. His work was mainly in theater, but he worked in films and television sporadically from 1958. He is known for television roles on Matlock and Seinfeld, and particularly as Doctor Hayward on Twin Peaks, a series co-created by his son Mark Frost. He has also appeared in TV movies, such as Psycho IV: The Beginning (1990) and The Stand (1994).

Early life
Frost was born in 1925 in Newburyport, Massachusetts, and was raised in the Bronx and Essex Junction, Vermont.

At the age of 17, he enlisted in the United States Navy during World War II, and served aboard the destroyer escort  in Europe during the Normandy landings. At the age of 21, he enrolled as an English major at Middlebury College in Vermont under the G.I. Bill.

Career
Frost spent much of his career in the Twin Cities, teaching at the University of Minnesota and serving as artistic director of the Chimera Theater in St. Paul. He had a small yet memorable role in the film adaptation of Slaughterhouse Five (1972), which was shot in the Minneapolis area.

Frost's Hollywood work in shows such as Twin Peaks and Matlock was essentially his second career, following his retirement from teaching and stage direction. He was aged 60 when his son Mark, co-creator of Twin Peaks with David Lynch, cast him in the role of Dr. Will Hayward. Frost appeared in thirty episodes of the series, and reprised the role in the feature film Twin Peaks: Fire Walk with Me although his scenes were cut. His appearance in Twin Peaks led to a recurring role in the legal drama Matlock.

In the Seinfeld TV series he played Henry Ross, father of Susan Ross, George Costanza's fiancée. His onscreen wife in Seinfeld was played by his Twin Peaks co-star Grace Zabriskie.

Frost returned to play Doc Hayward in the revived series of Twin Peaks, which began airing in May 2017.

Personal life
Frost married Mary Virginia Calhoun in 1949 and was the father of novelist, television screenwriter, and producer Mark Frost, actress Lindsay Frost, and writer Scott Frost. He was the grandfather of baseball player Lucas Giolito and actor Casey Giolito. He also has a grandson from his oldest son Mark.

Frost died at his home in Middlebury, Vermont, on February 17, 2017, following a long illness at the age of 91.

Filmography

Film

Television

References

External links
 

1925 births
2017 deaths
People from Newburyport, Massachusetts
Middlebury College alumni
Male actors from Massachusetts
Male actors from Vermont
American male stage actors
American male film actors
American male television actors
United States Navy personnel of World War II
University of Minnesota faculty
Frost family